Laith Gaith Pharaon is a global hospitality entrepreneur and real estate property developer. Earlier in his career, he competed on the offshore and F1 powerboat racing circuit for several years.

Life and career
Laith Pharaon was born September 8, 1968 in London, UK to Ghaith Pharaon and Hala Pharaon.

Entrepreneurship 
Pharaon is founder and chief executive officer of Orca Holding, an international investment holding company based in Valletta (Malta), with affiliated companies in several countries. He is member of the board of directors of National Refinery Limited and Attock Refinery Limited.

Racing titles and achievements 
From 1995 to 2006, Laith Pharaon competed internationally in offshore Motonautics races Class 1. He was inducted into the American Power Boat Association (APBA) Hall of Champions in 1996. He won 4 races of the World Championship F1; a Championship of the USA (1996); European and World Titles (1997); Pole Position World Title (1998).

American Power Boat Association APBA - Offshore Category 
 1996 - 1st place

Union Internationale Motonautique (UIM) - World Class I - 16 litre - Offshore Championship 
 1997 - 1st place
 1998 -  4th place
 1999 - Retired

Union Internationale Motonautique (UIM) - World F1 Championship 
 2000 - 17th
 2001 - 5th
 2002 - 2nd
 2003 - 4th
 2004 - 9th
 2005 - 7th
 2006 - 23rd

References

1968 births
Living people
Motorboat racers